Pierre Camonin (25 February 1903 – 14 November 2003) was a French organist, composer and improviser.

Biography 
Born in Bar-le-Duc, Camonin was a student of Marcel Ciampi for the piano at the conservatoire de Paris. He studied pipe organ with Louis Vierne and Marcel Dupré. He was ordained a priest in 1929.

He was a vicar-organist at Ligny-en-Barrois, then organist in charge of the great organs of the Verdun Cathedral (where he succeeded Ernest Grosjean) alongside the maître de chapelle, canon Ferdinand Tourte. Its titulariate extended from 1935 until his death. Vincent Warnier was appointed co-titular in 1997. Several substitutes (Mr. Géhin, Vialette in the 1970s) generally provided the low masses.

Among the students of Canon Pierre Camonin who made a career as organist is Dominique Bréda (born in 1956), organist at St Léon in Nancy.

Pierre Camonin died in Verdun, Meuse.

Works 
 Messe mariale (organ, éd. Europart)
 Prelude to a canticle by Charles Bordes
 Offertoire on Tota pulchra es
 Élévation on Ave Maria
 Communion on Salve Regina
 Toccata on Salve Mater
 Improvisation pour un 11 novembre (organ and brass; transcription for solo organ  performed by the author at N. D. de Paris during a Sunday recital.)
 Noëls variés (orgue, éd. Europart).
 Vêpres de Noël
 Variations on Minuit sonne au clocher blanc
 Variations on O Dieu, que n'étais-je en vie
 Variations sur un noël alsacien
 Trois noëls
 For a victory anniversary (organ, series Autour de la Marseillaise, ed. Chant du Monde)
 Sonata for trumpet and organ
 Toccata on Salve Mater (organ)
 Rhapsodie pascale (organ)
 Intermezzo (organ)
 Rondo sur un thème de Rameau (organ)
 Prélude to the introit Cibavit (organ)
 Postlude pour la Fête Dieu, on Tantum Ergo
 Le jongleur de Notre Dame (organ), one of his last compositions, a sort of self-portrait.
 Crépuscule (organ), also a latter work
 Presto (organ)
 Rhapsodie Johannique
 Allegro maestro [sic, as recorded on a program]
 Andante cantabile
 Allegro final
 L'Église triomphante (organ)
 "This piece is built on the Hymn of the Dedication: Coelestis Urbs Jerusalem, where the waiting and preparations for the final judgment take place successively, the call of the trumpets, the resurrection of the dead, the terror of the confounded wicked, the procession of the virgins, the triumph of the chosen" (extract of the program of the blessing of the rebuilt organs of N. D. de Verdun, 35 March 1935

Discography 
 2 33rpm 30 cm mono, 1960s, local publisher; Pierre Camonin performs his works
 CD K 617055 L'orgue en Lorraine, containing the transfert of recording 33rpm (mono) of the improvisation for 11 November; Pierre Camonin (organ of N.D. de Verdun) and music of the 151° R.I.M de Metz
 CD UCD 16694 "Le grand orgue héroïque": prelude to marian mass; François Henri Houbart at the great organs of N. D. de Verdun
 CD Calliope CAL 6933 "Un Noël en Champagne" : Variations sur le noël lorrain "Minuit sonne au clocher blanc"; André Isoir at the organs of St Brice d'Aÿ
 CD REGCD155 "The Organ Club 75th Anniversary": Communion (and pieces by other composers); English organs and organists
 recital of 17 May 1987, Pierre Camonin at the great organs of N. D. de Verdun (private collection)

References

External links 
 Biogrampy on Musica et Memoria
 Orgue Cathédrale de VERDUN Pierre Camonin improvises on 11 November 1966 on YouTube
 Pierre Camonin - Œuvres pour orgue on bayardmusique.com
 Pierre Camonin on IdRef
 Pierre Camonin on Musicalics

People from Bar-le-Duc
1903 births
2003 deaths
French centenarians
20th-century French Roman Catholic priests
French classical organists
French male organists
20th-century French composers
French composers of sacred music
Conservatoire de Paris alumni
20th-century French male musicians
Men centenarians
Male classical organists